Nationwide Mutual Insurance Co. v. Darden, 503 U.S. 318 (1992), is a US labor law case, concerning the scope of protection for employees, under the Employee Retirement Income Security Act of 1974 (ERISA). The Court held that principles of agency were relevant to interpreting the concept of "employee".

Background
Robert Darden sold Nationwide Mutual Insurance Company policies from 1962 to 1980 in Fayetteville, North Carolina. His agency contract stated he would be enrolled in the company retirement plan. The contract said, if his job terminated, he would forfeit entitlements if he worked and competed with Nationwide within 25 miles of his business location. In November 1980, Nationwide terminated its contractual relationship. A month later, Darden started selling insurance policies for Nationwide’s competitors. Nationwide said he was disqualified from receiving retirement benefits. Darden sued under the Employee Retirement Income Security Act of 1974 (ERISA), 29 USC §1132(a). He contended he was protected as an ‘employee’ under §3(6), 29 USC §1002(6), and that under 29 USC §1053(a) his benefits had ‘vested’ and could not be forfeited. Nationwide argued Darden was not an employee, but an independent contractor.

Procedural history
At trial, the federal district Court held Darden was an independent contractor, not an employee, under common law agency principles. Darden appealed.

The Court of Appeals for the Fourth Circuit found Darden was an employee, and that ERISA’s policy had gone beyond common law agency principles. It asserted that "Darden most probably would not qualify as an employee" under traditional agency law principles. But Darden would be an employee, under the ERISA policy, if he could show (1) he had a reasonable expectation that he would receive benefits, (2) he relied on this expectation, and (3) he lacked the economic bargaining power to contract out of benefit plan forfeiture provisions.

Opinion of the Court
The Court held that ERISA did incorporate traditional agency law. Where nothing is definite, the Court would presume Congress meant an agency law relationship unless clearly stating otherwise, as in Community for Creative Non-Violence v. Reid, 490 U.S. 730, 739-740 (1989) The first two prongs of the substitute test of the Court of Appeals, insofar as it produced new standards of expectations and reliance, were ill founded. All of the incidents of the employment relationship must be assessed and weighed with no one factor being decisive. In an opinion for the majority of the Court, Justice Souter stated

The Court remanded the case to the District Court for reconsideration.

Significance

The result of the case was to affirm that principles of agency, alongside "economic reality" or remedying inequality of bargaining according to the purpose of a statute, must be taken into account when determining who is an employee. Common law tests are not to be disregarded.

See also
US labor law

References

External links
 

United States labor case law
1992 in United States case law
United States Supreme Court cases
United States Supreme Court cases of the Rehnquist Court
Employee Retirement Income Security Act of 1974